Jordan Isaac Aldon Dangerfield (born December 25, 1990) is an American football safety who is currently a free agent. He played college football at Towson and was signed as an undrafted free agent by the Buffalo Bills in 2013. Dangerfield has also been a member of the Brooklyn Bolts of the FXFL.

Early and personal life
Dangerfield was born in Elmont, New York, and is a member of the Ethiopian Jewish community.

He attended Royal Palm Beach High School in Royal Palm Beach, Florida, where he played football as a receiver and defensive back, was named to Palm Beach Post and Sun-Sentinel first-team as a junior and senior, and received second-team All-Florida honors as a senior in 2008. He then attended Hofstra University, for whom he played in eight games, and after it closed its football program he attended Towson University. In 2010 for Towson he was named first-team All-CAA and first-team All-ECAC, as well as first-team All-American by College Sports Journal, and was named Towson University's Male Athlete of the Year. In 2011 he was named first-team All-Colonial Athletic Association, and in 2012 he was named pre-season All-CAA and earned third-team pre-season All-America honors from The Sports Network.

After entering professional football, he chipped away at remaining classes at Towson and in 2019 earned his degree.

Professional career

Buffalo Bills
Dangerfield was signed by the Bills as an undrafted rookie free agent following the 2013 NFL Draft. He was released by the team on August 30, 2013.

Pittsburgh Steelers
Dangerfield signed a reserve/future contract with the Steelers on January 10, 2014. He was released on August 26, and signed to the practice squad on November 5. He was released and re-signed to the practice squad throughout the 2014 and 2015 seasons before making the final roster in 2016.

On January 27, 2017, Dangerfield re-signed with the Steelers on a one-year deal. On September 4, Dangerfield was waived/injured by the Steelers and placed on injured reserve. He was released on September 8. He was re-signed to the practice squad on October 16. He signed a reserve/future contract with the Steelers on January 15, 2018.

On March 20, 2020, Dangerfield re-signed with the Steelers.

See also
 List of select Jewish football players

References

1990 births
Living people
African-American Jews
American football safeties
American people of Ethiopian-Jewish descent
Brooklyn Bolts players
Buffalo Bills players
Hofstra Pride football players
Jewish American sportspeople
People from Elmont, New York
Pittsburgh Steelers players
Players of American football from New York (state)
Sportspeople from Nassau County, New York
Towson Tigers football players
21st-century American Jews